The LXXXV Army Corps was an army corps of the German Wehrmacht during World War II. The corps existed between 1944 and 1945 and had been preceded by a formation known as Group Knieß between 1943 and 1944.

History 
Group Knieß, also known as General Command Knieß, was formed in October 1943 in southern France. The formations was named after its initial commander, Baptist Knieß. Under the supervision of the 19th Army, Group Knieß remained on defensive duty in France until the Normandy landings on 6 June 1944.

On 10 July 1944, Corps Kniess was upgraded to become the LXXXV Army Corps. The LXXXV Army Corps remained under the supervision of the 19th Army until December 1944, when the corps was transferred to the 7th Army in the Ardennes. After a stay in the Saar Palatinate region between February and March 1945 under the 1st Army, the LXXXV was transferred back to the 7th Army in Hesse and Thuringia in April. At the end of the war, the LXXXV Army Corps was commanded by Smilo Freiherr von Lüttwitz, who had held that post since 26 March 1945.

Structure

Noteworthy individuals 

 Baptist Knieß, corps commander of Corps Knieß and the LXXXV Army Corps (October 1943 – 10 July 1944, 10 July 1944 – 15 November 1944, 16 December 1944 – 26 March 1945).
 Friedrich-August Schack, corps commander of the LXXXV Army Corps (15 November 1944 – 16 December 1944).
 Smilo Freiherr von Lüttwitz, corps commander of the LXXXV Army Corps (26 March 1945 – 8 May 1945).

Notes

References 

Corps of Germany in World War II
Military units and formations established in 1943
Military units and formations established in 1944
Military units and formations disestablished in 1944
Military units and formations disestablished in 1945